The 2017 Chinese Football Association Division Two League season was the 28th season since its establishment in 1989. The league was expanded to 24 teams, with 12 teams in North Group and 12 teams in South Group.

Team changes

To League Two 
Teams relegated from 2016 China League One
 Qingdao Jonoon
 Hunan Billows

Teams entered from 2016 China Amateur Football League  
 Dalian Boyang
 Shaanxi Chang'an Athletic
 Shanghai Sunfun
 Jilin Baijia
 Zhenjiang Huasa

From League Two 
Teams promoted to 2017 China League One
 Lijiang Jiayunhao 
 Baoding Yingli ETS

Team withdrawal
 Tianjin Huochetou

Name changes 
 Meizhou Meixian Hakka F.C. changed its name to Meizhou Meixian Techand F.C. in December 2016.
 Shenzhen Renren F.C. changed its name to Shenzhen Ledman F.C. in December 2016.
 Hainan Boying & Seamen F.C. changed its name to Hainan Boying F.C. in January 2017.
 Dalian Boyang F.C. changed its name to Dalian Boyoung F.C. in February 2017.

Clubs

Clubs and locations

Clubs Locations

Managerial changes

League table

North Group

South Group

Overall table

Play-offs

21st–24th place

|}

Hainan Boying won 2–0 on aggregate.

Zhenjiang Huasa won 4–1 on aggregate.

19th–20th place

|}

17th–18th place

|}

15th–16th place

|}

13th–14th place

|}

11th–12th place

|}

9th–10th place

|}

Quarter-finals

|}

Yinchuan Helanshan won 4–2 on aggregate.

Heilongjiang Lava Spring won 1–0 on aggregate.

Shenzhen Ledman won 1–0 on aggregate.

Meizhou Meixian Techand won 3–2 on aggregate.

Semi-finals

|}

Heilongjiang Lava Spring won 4–0 on aggregate.

Meizhou Meixian Techand won 3–1 on aggregate.

Third-Place Match

Final Match

Relegation play-off

|}

Yanbian Beiguo won 7–5 on aggregate.

Lhasa Urban Construction Investment won 2–1 on aggregate.

Top scorers
{| class="wikitable"
|-
!Rank
!Player
!Club
!Total
|-
!rowspan=1|
| Ma Xiaolei
|Shenzhen Ledman
|
|-
!rowspan=2|
| Qu Cheng
|Sichuan Longfor
|
|-
| Yang Zi
|Shenzhen Ledman
|
|-
!rowspan=2|
| Wang Ziming
|Heilongjiang Lava Spring
|
|-
| Zhu Shiyu
|Qingdao Jonoon
|
|-
!rowspan=5|
| Gong Zheng
|Beijing BIT
|
|-
| Shi Jun
|Hebei Elite
|
|-
| Tan Tiancheng
|Yinchuan Helanshan
|
|-
| Wang Chaolong
|Jiangsu Yancheng Dingli
|
|-
| Ye Weichao
|Meizhou Meixian Techand
|
|-

Awards
The awards of 2017 China League Two were announced on 29 November 2017.
 Most valuable player:  Li Shuai (Heilongjiang Lava Spring)
 Golden Boot:  Ma Xiaolei (Shenzhen Ledman)
 Best goalkeeper:  Wang Qi (Qingdao Jonoon)
 Young Player of the Year:  Zhong Yihao (Qingdao Jonoon)
 Best coach:  Duan Xin (Heilongjiang Lava Spring)
 Fair play award: Yinchuan Helanshan, Dalian Boyoung, Suzhou Dongwu, Shanghai JuJu Sports, Sichuan Longfor, Shaanxi Chang'an Athletic 
 Best referee:  Jia Zhiliang,  Sun Shengyu,  Su Xiaofei

League attendance
Updated to Final Round

††

††
†
†
††

††

††

References

External links
Official site 
News and results at mytiyu.cn 

3
China League Two seasons